Jadeah Museum is one of Al-Qassim museums which lies in Al-Rass Governorate, Saudi Arabia.

The museum was founded by Khalid bin Mohammed Aljedae. It looks like a castle which includes a mosque, a group of old buildings, rooms and the popular house, known as (Bait Aljadah). Furthermore, it has more than 7,000 valuable and rare artefacts.

See also

 List of museums in Saudi Arabia

References

Gregory, I. (1969). The Ore bin; Vol. 31 No. 5 (May 1969).

Museums with year of establishment missing
History museums in Saudi Arabia
Al-Qassim Province